Kenwood Hill is a hill and neighborhood on the south side of Louisville, Kentucky, United States. Its boundaries are New Cut Road, Kenwood Drive, Southside Drive and Palatka Road. The hill, earlier known as Sunshine Hill and then Cox's Knob, was used by Native Americans to spot buffalo. By 1868 Benoni Figg owned the area as a part of his charcoal business. His family oversaw development on the land until it was sold in 1890 to a development company which named the area Kenwood Hill. Southern Parkway (initially called Grand Boulevard) was opened soon after in 1893.

In 1893, Kenwood Hill residents Patty and Mildred J. Hill composed the song "Good Morning to All", which was to become "Happy Birthday to You".

While wealthy Louisvillians built summer homes in the area, and the first subdivision did not begin until 1942, the neighborhood was widely developed by the 1960s, so much so that extensive work was needed to halt erosion on the hill in the 1980s.

See also
Iroquois, Louisville
Iroquois Park
Colonial Gardens
Little Loomhouse

References

Further reading

External links
   Images of Kenwood Hill (Louisville, Ky.) in the University of Louisville Libraries Digital Collections
"Kenwood Hill: Heights First Housed Cool Retreats; Senning's, Summers Parks Addressed the Playful Side of People" — Article by Linda Lyly of The Courier-Journal

Neighborhoods in Louisville, Kentucky
1890 establishments in Kentucky
Populated places established in 1890
Landforms of Louisville, Kentucky
Hills of Kentucky